Potpeć Lake (sometimes rendered Potpecko Lake) is reservoir on the Lim River, in Serbia. After heavy rains in January 2021, masses of floating plastic garbage threatened to clog the dam's intakes.

Considering that the Belgrade-Bar railway passes along the dam and the main road leading from Belgrade to the Montenegrin coast, it has a distinct potential for the development of transit tourism, which is currently underused. In addition, it is suitable for active tourism and fishing. Zander, catfish and trout can be caught in the lake.

References

Lakes of Serbia